Gapići is a village in the municipality of Kalinovik, Republika Srpska, Bosnia and Herzegovina.

References

Villages in Bosnia and Herzegovina
Populated places in Konjic